The 1898 Balıkesir earthquake occurred around 11:30 local time (8:30 UTC) on 29 January 1898 in Ottoman Empire, modern Turkey. It was the deadliest earthquake in history of Balıkesir. Around 500 people died as a result of the earthquake. Only 51 of the 11,000 buildings in city remained unaffected. Around 53,000 people from the city and around the city were affected.

References 

History of Balıkesir Province
Earthquakes in Turkey
1898 earthquakes
1898 disasters in the Ottoman Empire
1898 in the Ottoman Empire